Dendrophysa semifasciata, commonly known as the goatee croaker, is a species of fish native to the Indo-Pacific region.

References

Fish of Thailand
Fish of India
Fish described in 1829
Fish of the Pacific Ocean
Sciaenidae